Friedrich "Fritz" Förderer (5 January 1888 – 20 December 1952) was a German amateur footballer who played as a defender and competed in the 1912 Summer Olympics. He was born in Karlsruhe and died in Weimar.

He was a member of the German Olympic squad and played two matches in the consolation tournament and scored five goals. He played for Karlsruher FV, where together with Julius Hirsch and Gottfried Fuchs he formed an attacking trio. 

He joined the Nazi party in 1942 and would go on to coach various football teams, including one composed of members of the Third SS Death-Head unit that ran the Buchenwald concentration camp.

His teammate Hirsch became the first German to score four international goals in a game in a 5-5 draw with the Netherlands in Zwolle in March 1912. His club teammate Fuchs would spectacularly overtake his record by scoring 10 goals against Russia in July 1912.
In 1939, Hirsch was placed into forced labour by the municipal works service at a dump in Karlsruhe.

In December 1942, in an effort to protect his family, Hirsch divorced his wife to allow her and their children, who had been banished from school, to use her maiden name and hide their background. Yet this also removed whatever little chance he had of avoiding the deportations that had seen Jews disappear.

On March 1, 1943, he reported to Karlsruhe train station to be transported to the Auschwitz concentration camp for what the Nazis called “employment of labour in the East”.

His daughter Esther accompanied him to the station. “It is one of my worst memories,” she wrote afterwards. “It was a lovely day; to this day I don’t understand how the sun could have been shining. We didn’t believe that we would never see him again.

“That night, we, mother, my brother and I, all woke up simultaneously. At the same moment, we all thought: something has happened. My father never thought that the Germans would be able to do something to him. He couldn’t imagine that they would do something to a soldier at the front and a footballer in the national team. He was connected to Germany, he was pro-Germany, as was his brother.”

“It was so humiliating for him to perform forced labour in Karlsruhe. He was a good man, always so understanding. I loved him very much, and I’m still grateful to him for his affection.”

Two days later, Hirsch sent a letter to Esther for her 15th birthday, believed to be from a stop at Dortmund en route to Auschwitz. He wrote: “My darling, I am very well, and I arrived safely. I will [eventually] reach Upper Silesia, [and will] still [be] in Germany. Greetings and kisses, Juler [Julius].”

This was the last the family ever heard from Hirsch, who is believed to have died in Auschwitz, although there was no record of him having reached the camp. It is thought he might have been gassed as soon as his train arrived without being officially registered. In January 1950, a German court declared him dead and set his date of death as May 8, 1945, when he would have been 53 years old.

Hirsch’s former teammate Fuchs avoided the fate of his one-time goal-scoring ally by escaping to Switzerland and France before settling in Canada, where he died at the age of 82 in 1972.

References

External links
Pictures at Karlsruher-fv1891.de 
Biography of Fritz Förderer 

1888 births
1952 deaths
German footballers
Germany international footballers
Olympic footballers of Germany
Footballers at the 1912 Summer Olympics
Karlsruher FV players
VfL Halle 1896 players
Footballers from Karlsruhe
German footballers needing infoboxes
Association football defenders